The University of Dili (Tetum: Universidade Dili) is based in the East Timorese capital Dili. Its abbreviated name is UNDIL.

External links
 http://undil.tl

Universities in East Timor
Dili
Educational institutions established in 2014
2014 establishments in East Timor